The fall of Hatra, capital of the Kingdom of Hatra under Sanatruq II, took place in the 3rd century after a lengthy siege by the Sasanian king Shapur I. Hatra was plundered and abandoned, and its kingdom dissolved.

Background
During the Roman-Persian Wars, the Kingdom of Hatra was a buffer state between the Roman Empire and the Parthian Empire, and the dynasty was mostly under influence of the latter. Its capital city Hatra was strongly fortified, and managed to repulse sieges by Roman emperors Trajan (in 117 AD) and Septimius Severus (in 193 and 197 AD). During the reign of Sanatruq II, the kingdom expanded, and as the Parthian Empire was succeeded by the Sasanian Empire, Hatra shifted its loyalty and became a vassal kingdom of the Romans. The Sasanian king Ardashir I unsuccessfully besieged the city in 220s. Latin dedications from the year 235 in Hatra's ruins suggest there was presence of Roman army in the city in that period.

Siege and aftermath
Modern sources put the date of Hatra's fall in 240–241 AD (or April 241 AD) per the newly discovered document Cologne Mani Codex (18.2-8), which is the year that Ardashir I crowned his son Shapur I as the co-regent. Either of these may have conquered Hatra. The siege took one year, or two years, according to al-Tabari.

After the city's conquest, it was plundered, its fortifications were destroyed, the city was deserted and never resettled, and the Kingdom of Hatra was disestablished. In 363, Ammianus Marcellinus passed by Hatra together with the Roman army and has described it as an "old city situated in an uninhabited area and deserted for a long time past".

The fall of Hatra is described in medieval Arabic and Persian traditions via stories that mix facts and fiction. The legend tells of the Hatrene princess al-Nadirah who betrayed the city to Shapur I after falling in love with him.

The Sasanian capture of Hatra is thought to be the cause of the Persian war of Gordian III.

References

Further reading
 

Roman–Sasanian Wars
Hatra
Iraq in the Roman era
Hatra
240
241
Hatra
240s in the Roman Empire
Sasanian Empire
Shapur I
Hatra
Hatra
Sieges of Hatra
Hatra
3rd century in Iran